Reinsch is a Germanic surname. It may refer to:

 Diether Roderich Reinsch (born 1940), a German Byzantinist
 Gabriele Reinsch (born 1963), a German track and field athlete
 Hugo Reinsch (1809–1884), a German chemist and botanist
 J. Leonard Reinsch (1908–1991), an American broadcasting executive
 Paul Friedrich Reinsch (1836–1914), a botanist
 Paul Samuel Reinsch (1869–1923), an American political scientist and diplomat